Dominguito del Val (died c. 1250) was a legendary child of Medieval Spain, who was allegedly a choirboy ritually murdered by Jews in Zaragoza (Saragossa). Dominguito is the protagonist of the first blood libel in the history of Spain – stories that grew in prominence in the 12th and 13th centuries of the Middle Ages, and contributed to antisemitic incidents. According to the legend, Dominguito was ritually murdered by Jews of Zaragoza.

Saint Dominguito is no longer included on the official Roman Catholic liturgical calendar; however, there is still a chapel dedicated to him in the cathedral of Zaragoza.  There exists little historical evidence of Dominguito aside from the stories and legends built around him.

Dominguito's legend
The historical basis for Dominguito is unclear. No medieval references to the legend have been found; the first texts that recount the tale date from 1583, three hundred thirty-three years after the fact. The story appears to have been largely copied from the legend of Little Saint Hugh of Lincoln, collected by Fray Alonso de Espina. According to the accounts, Alfonso X of Castile wrote the original rendition of the story in 1250, saying: "We have heard it said that some very cruel Jews, in memory of the Passion of Our Lord on Good Friday, kidnapped a Christian boy and crucified him."

According to the legend, Dominguito was born in Zaragoza and was admitted as a cathedral altar-boy and chorister at La Seo because of beautiful voice. He disappeared on 31 August 1250, when he was seven years old. Some months later, some boatmen discovered the decomposed corpse on the bank of Ebro river.

The story goes that one day on his way home the boy met a Jew by the name of Albayuceto, deceived him and brought him to a house in the Jewish quarter, where he was nailed to a cross and tortured until he died. In an effort to dispose of the body, they beheaded him, cut off the feet and buried the corpse on the banks of the Ebro River.

The child's bones were later interred in the cathedral, where in the chapel of Santo Dominguito del Val they are still revered as holy relics. Dominguito is still revered as a saint and celebrated in 31 August in the diocese of Zaragoza.

The story resembles others like the so-called "Holy Children" of La Guardia (inspired by a real inquisitorial process 1491).

The story has similarities with other tales circulating in medieval Europe alleging the murder of a child at hands of Jews. These were symptomatic of the growing anti-Semitism in the Middle Ages. During the Middle Ages it was very frequent that in the face of any misfortune -weather, droughts, etc.- the Jewish community was blamed. Often, these stories were used to rationalize imposing greater repressive measures against the Jews.

References

Sources
 Álvarez Chillida, Gonzalo (2002). The Antisemitism in Spain.  The image of the Jew (1812–2002).  Madrid: Marcial Pons.  p. 47. . 
 Whitechapel, Simon.  Flesh Inferno: Atrocities of Torquemada and the Spanish Inquisition (Creation Books, 2003). 

1250 deaths
13th-century births
People from Zaragoza
Blood libel
Roman Catholic child saints
Folk saints
Spanish Roman Catholic saints
Spanish children
Spanish victims of crime
Antisemitism in Spain
Folk Catholicism